The Black Hills Central Railroad is a heritage railroad that operates in Keystone, South Dakota, United States. The railroad was added to the National Register of Historic Places on February 5, 2003.

It currently operates the 1880 Train on the former Keystone Branch of the Burlington Northern Railroad (BN) between Hill City, South Dakota and Keystone, South Dakota.  This railroad line was originally built by the Chicago, Burlington and Quincy Railroad (CB&Q) to serve mining and timber interests in the Black Hills. It reached Keystone on January 20, 1900 and was later used to haul equipment for carving nearby Mount Rushmore.

The Black Hills Central Railroad restores early twentieth century-era locomotives and train cars and has been featured on television shows such as the Gunsmoke episode "Snow Train", General Hospital and the TNT mini-series Into the West.  It also appeared in the movie Orphan Train.

Trains operate between early May and early October over the scenic  line.

The South Dakota State Railroad Museum is located adjacent to the Hill City depot, on BHCR land.

History
 
In 1956 two steam enthusiasts, William Heckman and Robert Freer, promoted to “have in operation at least one working steam railroad, for boys of all ages who share America’s fondness for the rapidly vanishing steam locomotive.” They soon gathered financial, political and popular support for this venture adjacent to the tourist destination of Mount Rushmore. The intention was to have summer steam train operations with 1880-period equipment.

Narrow Gauge

Heckman and Freer proposed a new three foot gauge heritage railroad, using the Keystone Branch, by laying a third rail on five miles of the standard gauge track. CB&Q was supportive, and the dual-gauge line was constructed from Hill City to a new terminus with a wye, to be named “Oblivion” about midway along the branch. The choice of narrow gauge was influenced by the availability, also from CB&Q, of a complete 1880s styled "Deadwood Central" trainset which had been assembled for the Chicago Railroad Fair of 1948–49. This consisted of:

 Colorado and Southern Number 9, a 2-6-0 built in 1882, which had been named Chief Crazy Horse for the Fair.

 Coaches, open observation cars and a railway post office car of 1880s style, but which had been built new by CB&Q.

Additionally, White Pass & Yukon Number 69, an outside-framed 2-8-0 built in 1908 was acquired, to be named Klondike Casey

The narrow gauge operation began in 1957 and ran successfully for several years until a decision was made to extend the operation to Keystone, which included a change to standard gauge. The third rail was removed in 1964 (although as of 2022, the abandoned Oblivion Wye rails remain in place), and the locos and rolling stock were eventually divested to other heritage railways: Number 69 went to the Nebraska Midland Railroad in 1973, and then home to the White Pass in 2001. Number 9 went to the Georgetown Loop in Colorado in 1988. As of 2020, Number 69 is operable but has been stored since 2013, and Number 9 is on static display at Breckinridge, Colorado, having suffered mechanical damage in 2006.

Standard Gauge

BHCR gradually acquired its current range of locomotives and rolling stock, and continued operations over the full length of the branch until the 1972 Black Hills flood destroyed the last three miles of track into Keystone. Burlington Northern relocated and rebuilt two miles, to a new Keystone Junction a mile west of the town. During the rebuilding, the BHCR ran its trains out of Custer, 15 miles south of Hill City on BN’s Deadwood branch. In 1977 the Black Hills Central returned to the Keystone branch, and in 1981 acquired the trackage from BN, which withdrew freight services after its freight traffic had withered away. The last mile was continued into Keystone in 2001.

In 1986 Burlington Northern abandoned the Deadwood branch through Hill City, leaving the BHCR as an isolated railroad. (The entire former Deadwood line is now the George S. Mickelson Trail, a long distance rail trail.)

Preserved equipment

Locomotives

The BHCR operates five rare, well-preserved and operational steam locomotives, As of 2021:
 #7, Baldwin 2-6-2, built 1919 as P&NW no. 7. On display.
 #103, Baldwin 2-6-2T, built 1922 as Silver Falls Timber Company (S.F.T.Co.) #103 before being sold to the BHCR in 1965. In storage.
 #104, Baldwin 2-6-2T tank locomotive (pictured), built 1926 as S.F.T.Co. #104 before being sold to the BHCR in 1965. Operational.
 #108, Baldwin 2-6-6-2T, built 1926 as Potlatch Lumber Company no. 24. Acquired by Northwest Railway Museum in Snoqualmie, Washington. Sold to the BHCR in 2016. Restored to operating condition in August 2020. Operational.
 #110, Baldwin 2-6-6-2T, built 1928 as Weyerhauser Timber Company no. 110. Later Rayonier no. 110. Operational.

The Black Hills Central Railroad also has two diesel locomotives on its engine roster as of 2021:
 #63, EMD GP9, formerly Chesapeake and Ohio Railway (C&O) #6178. Operational.
 #6657, Whitcomb 80 Tonner, built 1943 as U.S. Army #7379. Operational.

Rolling Stock

Eight coaches are wood-bodied, arch-windowed former electric interurban cars built in 1912-13 for the Oregon Electric Railway, acquired in 1970. Two of these have been cut down to the belt rail to serve as open cars.

South of the Hill City depot, a small rail yard holds a variety of rolling stock, mostly early twentieth century, awaiting restoration.

References

External links

 Black Hills Central Railroad ("The 1880 Train") official website - website broken 8/2022

Heritage railroads in South Dakota
Black Hills
Tourist attractions in Pennington County, South Dakota
Transportation in Pennington County, South Dakota